Yo no creo en los hombres, is a Mexican telenovela produced by Lucy Orozco in association with Isabelle Tardán for Televisa in 1991. This is based on the radionovela Yo no creo en los hombres written by Caridad Bravo Adams.

Plot 
The telenovela tells the story of a wealthy, malicious family formed by Leonor, a cruel woman, and her two children: Arturo and Maleny. Arturo meets a beautiful, young woman named María Dolores.

María Dolores falls in love with Arturo, who after seducing her, leaves and marries another woman, Luisa. Arturo later abuses Maria Dolores and during a struggle between the two, Arturo dies.

Maria is then blamed for his death and sentenced to 30 years in jail. There, she swears to herself to never believe in men. After regaining her freedom, Maria meets Gustavo, a lawyer who falls for her and makes her believe in love again.

Cast

Main cast 

Saby Kamalich as Leonor Ibáñez
Bruno Rey as Pedro Miranda
Óscar Morelli as Lic. Salas
Bárbara Gil as Laura Miranda
Martha Navarro as Esperanza Robledo
Ana Colchero as Maleny Ibáñez
Pilar Escalante as Silvia Montesinos
Gabriela Roel as María Dolores Robledo
Alfredo Adame as Gustavo Miranda
Rafael Rojas as Arturo Ibáñez

Also main cast 
Hugo Acosta as Tony
Yolanda Andrade as Clara Robledo
Jorge Antolín as José Alberto
Felipe Casillas as Jacinto
Dora Cordero as Cecilia
Alberto Estrella as Alfonso
Astrid Hadad as Paca
Leonor Llausás as Honoria
Alejandro Rábago as Aurelio
Federica Sánchez Fogarty as Elena García
Ricardo Silva
José Suárez as Leonardo Miranda
José Luis Yaber as Génaro
Humberto Yáñez as Raúl Gómez

Recurring cast 
Damián Alcázar as Juan
Ninón Sevilla as Emelia
Jorge Acosta as Higinio
Anna Ciocchetti as Josefina
Guillermo Quintanilla as El Flaco

Awards and nominations

References 

1991 telenovelas
Mexican telenovelas
Televisa telenovelas
1991 Mexican television series debuts
1991 Mexican television series endings
Spanish-language telenovelas
Television shows set in Mexico City